"100" is a single by South Korean supergroup SuperM. It was released on August 14, 2020, through SM Entertainment and Capitol Records, as the first pre-release single from the group's debut studio album, Super One, which was released on September 25, 2020.

Composition and lyrics 
"100" was described as a track with a fast base line and dynamic rhythms that expresses SuperM's unique and powerful energy. The song was composed by Mark, Harold "Alawn" Philippon, Andy Love, Jasmine Kara Khatib-nia, Ryan S. Jhun and Yoo Young-jin, with the arrangement was held by Alawn, Love and Yoo, who also co-wrote the lyrics with Mark.

Critics have described it as an anthemic dubstep-inspired track with big, techno-style beats and an aggressive, thumping bass line that wraps around staccato-style raps and a slinky melody. In terms of musical notation, the song is composed in the key of G major, with a tempo of 115 beats per minute and is three minutes and twenty six seconds long.

Live performances 
On August 20, 2020 the group made their American morning TV debut on Good Morning America performing the song. SuperM also performed the song on Music Station on August 21. On August 29, SuperM performed "100" at a-nation online 2020.

Charts

Release history

Credits and personnel 
Credits adapted from album's liner notes.

Studio 
 SM Booming System – recording, mixing, engineered for mix, digital editing
 Sonic Korea – mastering

Personnel 

 SM Entertainment – executive producer
 Lee Soo-man – producer
 Lee Sung-soo – production director, executive supervisor 
 Tak Young-jun – executive supervisor
 SuperM – vocals, background vocals 
 Mark – lyrics, composition
 Andy Love – producer, lyrics, composition, arrangement 
 Harold "Alawn" Philippon – producer, composition, arrangement
 Yoo Young-jin – producer, lyrics, composition, arrangement, vocal directing, background vocals, recording, mixing, engineered for mix, digital editing, music and sound supervisor 
 Jasmine Kara Khatib-nia – composition 
 Ryan S. Jhun – composition
 Jeon Hoon – mastering

References 

2020 singles
2020 songs
SuperM songs
Korean-language songs
SM Entertainment singles
Capitol Records singles
Songs written by Ryan S. Jhun
Songs written by Yoo Young-jin